Johanna Sibylla of Hanau-Lichtenberg (6 July 1564 at Château de Lichtenberg – 24 March 1636 in Runkel) was the first child of Philipp V, Count of Hanau-Lichtenberg from his first marriage with Countess Ludowika Margaretha of Zweibrücken-Bitsch (1540-1569).

Life 
On 1 February 1582, Johanna Sibylla married Count Wilhelm IV of Wied-Runkel and Isenburg (1581 – 13 September 1612), the son of Count Johann IV of Wied-Runkel and Isenburg (d. 15 June 1581) and Katharina of Hanau, Countess of Wied (1525-1581).  William succeeded his father in 1581 as Count of Upper Wied (Runkel and Dierdorf) and in the rest of Wied in 1595.

Issue
 Juliana (d. 24 August 1635), married on 18 May 1634 to Count Ludwig IV of Löwenstein-Wertheim (1598-1657)
 Elizabeth (24 August 1593 – 28 June 1635), married on 13 September 1614 to Count Philipp of Solms-Hohensolms-Lich
 Katharina Philippina Walpurgis (d. 1647), married on 29 October 1611 in Schadeck to Count Christoph of Leiningen-Westerburg (d. 1635)
 Maria Anna Magdalena, married in 1628 to Adolf of Wylich-Döringen
 Aemilia
 Johanetta

Ancestors

References 
 Adrian Willem Eliza Dek: De Afstammelingen van Juliana van Stolberg tot aan het jaar van de vrede van Munster, Zaltbommel, 1968.
 Detlev Schwennicke: Europäische Stammtafeln: Stammtafeln zur Geschichte der Europäischen Staaten. NF IV, Taf. 36.
 Reinhard Suchier: Genealogie des Hanauer Grafenhauses, in: Festschrift des Hanauer Geschichtsvereins zu seiner fünfzigjährigen Jubelfeier am 27. August 1894, Hanau, 1894
Ernst J. Zimmermann: Hanau Stadt und Land, 3rd ed., Hanau 1919, reprinted 1978

Footnotes 

German countesses
1564 births
1636 deaths
House of Hanau
16th-century German people
17th-century German people
16th-century German women
17th-century German women